George Edward Waites (12 March 1938 – 24 August 2000) was an English professional footballer who played as an outside forward or inside forward in the Football League for Leyton Orient (two spells), Norwich City and Brighton & Hove Albion. He was on the books of Millwall without making a league appearance, and also played non-league football for Harwich & Parkeston and Gravesend & Northfleet.

Waites was born in 1938 in Stepney, London, and died in 2000 in Watford, Hertfordshire, at the age of 62.

References

1938 births
2000 deaths
Footballers from Stepney
English footballers
Association football forwards
Harwich & Parkeston F.C. players
Leyton Orient F.C. players
Norwich City F.C. players
Brighton & Hove Albion F.C. players
Millwall F.C. players
Ebbsfleet United F.C. players
English Football League players